The provinces of Bulgaria are the first-level administrative subdivisions of the country.

Since 1999, Bulgaria has been divided into 28 provinces ( – oblasti; singular:  – oblast; also translated as "regions") which correspond approximately to the 28 districts (in  – okrǎg, plural:  – okrǎzi), that existed before 1987.

The provinces are further subdivided into 265 municipalities (singular:  – obshtina, plural:  – obshtini).

Sofia – the capital city of Bulgaria and the largest settlement in the country – is the administrative centre of both Sofia Province and Sofia City Province (Sofia-grad). The capital is included (together with three other cities plus 34 villages) in Sofia Capital Municipality (over 90% of whose population lives in Sofia), which is the sole municipality comprising Sofia City province.

Terminology 

The provinces do not have official names – legally (in the President's decree on their constitution), they are not named but only described as "oblast with administrative centre [Noun]" – together with a list of the constituting municipalities. In Bulgaria they are usually called "[Adjective] Oblast"; occasionally they are referred to as "Oblast [Noun]" and rarely as "oblast with administrative centre [Noun]".

The Bulgarian term "област" (oblast) is preferably translated into English as "province", in order to avoid disambiguation and distinguish from the former unit called "окръг" (okrag, translated as "district") and the term "регион" (always translated as "region"). At any rate, "district" and "region" are sometimes still used to name these contemporary 28 units.
 "region": "28 regions (en) / région (fr) / oblast (bg)" – in ISO 3166-2 Newsletter II-3 (2011-12-13, corrected 2011-12-15)
 "district": "The territory of the South Central Region encompasses five districts – Pazardzhik, Plovdiv, Smolyan, Haskovo, and Kyrdzhali." – in a website of the European Commission.

Provinces

History 

In 1987, the then-existing 28 districts were transformed into 9 large units (in Bulgarian called oblasts – provinces), which survived until 1999.→

The 9 large provinces are listed below, along with the pre-1987 districts (post-1999 small provinces) comprising them.

On 1 January 1999, the old districts were restored with some modifications, but the designation ("oblast") "province" was kept.

See also 
Administrative divisions below the province level:
List of cities and towns in Bulgaria
List of villages in Bulgaria
Municipalities of Bulgaria
Constituencies of Bulgaria, which are based on the provinces
ISO 3166-2:BG
List of Bulgarian provinces by GDP
Liste des gouverneurs des provinces bulgares

References 

 
Bulgaria, Provinces
Bulgaria 1
Provinces, Bulgaria
Lists of populated places in Bulgaria